Truce was an all female British R&B trio in the 1990s, consisting of lead singer Dianne Joseph, Janine Linton and Michelle Escoffery. Their biggest hit was "Eyes Don't Lie" which reached number 20 on the UK Singles Chart in 1998. They released their first album, Nothin' But the Truce in 1995 and had disbanded by 1998.

Escoffery continued to work as a singer, such as on K-Gee's debut album Bounce to This including the 2000 single "I Don't Really Care", and on Artful Dodger's 2001 hit "Think About Me". Joseph featured on a number of collaborations by Shy FX and T-Power including the top 20 hits "Shake Ur Body" and "Don't Wanna Know".

Discography

Albums
 Nothin' But the Truce (1995)
 Truce EP (1995)

Singles
 "Celebration of Life" (1994) - UK #51
 "The Finest" (1995) - UK #54
 "Treat U Right" (1995) - UK #90
 "Nothin' But a Party" (1997) - UK #71
 "Eyes Don't Lie" (1998) - UK #20

References

British contemporary R&B musical groups
Black British musical groups
British R&B girl groups
English girl groups
Musical groups disestablished in 1998
1998 disestablishments in England